Kim Hye-in (Hangul: , born June 3, 1992), known by her stage name Heyne, is a South Korean singer and entertainer. She debuted in 2013 with the single, "Different."

Discography

Singles

Filmography

Television (drama)

Television (variety)

References 

South Korean women pop singers
1992 births
Living people
21st-century South Korean singers
21st-century South Korean women singers